The following outline is provided as an overview of and topical guide to childhood:

Children – biologically, a child (plural: children) is generally a human between the stages of birth and puberty. Some definitions include the unborn  (termed fetus).  The legal definition of "child" generally refers to a minor, otherwise known as a person younger than the age of majority. "Child" may also describe a relationship with a parent or authority figure, or signify group membership in a clan, tribe, or religion; it can also signify being strongly affected by a specific time, place, or circumstance, as in "a child of nature" or "a child of the Sixties."

Child education 

Education reform
 Education
 Learning disability
 List of education topics
 Public education

School 

 School 
 School run 
 School uniform 
 Student

Stages 

 Educational stage
 Primary education
 Primary school
 Middle school
 Secondary education
 Secondary school

Methods and theories 

 Bilingual education
 Boarding School
 Country Day School movement 
 Homeschooling
 Montessori method 
 Orff Schulwerk
 Outcome-based education 
 Philosophy of education
 Phonics
 Prussian education
 Reggio Emilia approach
 Religious education
 Suzuki method
 Waldorf School

Instruction content and tools 

 Abacus
 Educational programming language
 Language education
 Mathematics education
 Origami
 Philosophy for Children
 Physical education
 Reading education
 Reading recovery
 Recess
 Religious education as a school subject
 School corporal punishment
 School discipline 
 Science education
 Writing development

Elsewhere

Preschool 

 Early childhood education
 Curricula in early childhood care and education
 Preschool
 Kindergarten
 Forest kindergarten

Childcare 

 Child care
 Babysitting
 Governess
 Nanny 
 Au pair

Extracurricular and informal 

 After-school activity
 Children's street culture 
 Extracurricular activity
 Music lesson
 Scouting
 Youth sports
 Youth system
 Unschooling

Growth and development 
 Child development 
 Nature versus nurture

Stages of formative period 
Child development stages
Pregnancy
Conception
Embryo
Fetus
 Infant
Childbirth
 Child
Early childhood
Early Childhood Development
Toddler
 Adolescence
Preadolescence
Puberty
Entering Adulthood

Aspects

Social development 

 Social emotional development
 Attachment Theory
 Attachment in children
 Child directed speech
 Language development
 Language acquisition
 Speech acquisition
 Baby talk
 Babbling
 Baby sign language
 Vocabulary Development
 Mama and papa
 Errors in early word use
 Crib talk
 Stranger Anxiety 
 Westermarck effect
 Private speech
 Peer group
 peer pressure
 Friendship
 Imaginary friend
 Child sexuality
 Puppy love

Personal care 

 Breastfeeding
 Baby bottle
 Infant bed
 Infant sleep
 Diaper
 Weaning
 Toilet Training

Physical development and growth 

 Development of the human body
 Growth hormone
 Motor skill
 Gross motor skill
 Crawling (human)
 Fine motor skill
 Childhood development of fine motor skills
 Grasp

Intellectual and cognitive development 

 Cognitive development
 Infant cognitive development
 Object permanence
 Mirror stage
 Comfort object
 Development of the nervous system in humans
 Learning
 Children's use of information
 Moral development
 Happy victimizing
 Theory of mind

Complications and divergence

Innate 
 Birth defect 
 Developmental disorder
 Asperger syndrome
 Attachment theory
 Attention deficit disorder
 Attention-deficit hyperactivity disorder
 Autism
 Down syndrome
 Growth hormone deficiency
 Disability
 Intellectual disability
 Physical disability

In life 
 Stillbirth
 Maternal death
 SIDS
 Maternal deprivation
 Infant mortality
 List of childhood diseases and disorders
 Feral child
 Infection in childcare
 Child poverty
 Childhood obesity
 Child prodigy
 Precocious puberty
 Delayed puberty

Society and Law

Family and guardianship

Relations 
 Parent
 Mother
 Father
 Sibling
 Brother 
 Sister
 Grandparent
 Aunt
 Uncle
 Cousin
 Extended family
 Stepfamily
 Godparent

Concepts 

 Parenting
 Child custody
 Family law
 Adoption
 Orphan
 Inheritance
 Child support 
 Incest taboo
 Surrogate mother 
 Fathers' rights 
 Illegitimacy 
 Divorce
 Best interests
 Morality and legality of abortion
 Sex-selective abortion 
 Voluntary childlessness

Legal rights, responsibilities and restrictions 

 Age limit
 Age of consent
 Age of criminal responsibility 
 Age of majority
 Children's rights movement
 Children's rights education
 Minor (law)
 Voting age
 Youth rights

Behaviour management 

 Child discipline
 Corporal punishment
 Corporal punishment in the home
 Grounding (discipline technique)
 Juvenile delinquency
 Spanking 
 Time-out (parenting)
 Young offender
 Youth detention center

Child protection and welfare 

 Child and Youth Care
 Child benefit
 Child labour laws
 Child protection
 Parental leave 
 Residential care
 Foster care
 Orphanage
 Social services
 UNICEF – the United Nations Children's Fund
 Welfare

Harm

Child abuse 
 Child sexual abuse
 Paedophilia
 Child pornography
 Child abuse
 Child neglect
 Child abandonment
 Child abduction
 Child murder
 Filicide
 Child selling
 Child slavery
 Infanticide
 Military use of children

Vulnerable situations and possible abuse 

Child marriage
 Child displacement
 Child actor
 Child refugee
 Child labour
 Children in emergencies and conflicts
 Homelessness
 Ephebophilia

History of children in society 

 History of childhood
 History of children in the military
 History of early childhood care and education
 History of education
 History of the family

Specific times and places 

 Childhood in Maya society
 Childhood in the Viking Age
 Childhood in medieval England
 Childhood in Scotland in the Middle Ages
 Childhood in early modern Scotland
 Stolen Generations
 Effect of World War I on children in the United States
 Children in the Holocaust
 Impact of the COVID-19 pandemic on children

Children's entertainment and leisure

Media and literature 

 Advertising to children
 Children's clothing
 Children's culture
 Children's literature
 Fairy tale
 Picture book
 Children's film
 Animation
 Children's music
 Nursery rhyme
 Lullaby
 Children's television series

Toys and games 

 Game
 List of children's games
 Play
 Playground
 Toy
 List of toys

See also 

 Child harness
 Child safety lock
 The World's Children's Prize for the Rights of the Child
 Piggy bank
 Genetic counseling
 Children's Day
 Student loan
 World Summit for Children
 Childhood studies
 Lina Medina
 List of youth topics
 Term of endearment

References 

Children
Children